Barbash is a surname. Notable people with the surname include:

Eddie Barbash, American saxophonist and member of the band Stay Human
Samantha Barbash, American entrepreneur and adult entertainment host
Tom Barbash (born 1950), American writer, educator, and critic
Uri Barbash (born 1946), Israeli film director